Llompart is a Spanish surname. Notable people with the surname include:

Alex Llompart (born 1990), Puerto Rican tennis player
Carlos Moyá Llompart (born 1976), retired Spanish tennis player
Gabriel Llompart y Jaume Santandreu (1862 - 1928), Spanish ecclesiastic
Jordi Llompart (born ?), Spanish-American, writer, producer, screenwriter and director
María Llompart (born 2000), Spanish footballer
Pedro Llompart (born 1982), Spanish basketballer
Tomeu Llompart (born 1944), retired Spanish footballer
Toni Muñoz (born 1982), Spanish footballer
Xisco (footballer, born 1980), full name Francisco Javier Muñoz Llompart, retired Spanish footballer

Spanish-language surnames